Selma James (born Selma Deitch; formerly Weinstein; August 15, 1930) is an American writer, and feminist and social activist who is co-author of the women's movement book The Power of Women and the Subversion of the Community (with Mariarosa Dalla Costa), co-founder of the International Wages for Housework Campaign, and coordinator of the Global Women's Strike.

Early life and activism
Deitch was born in the Brownsville neighborhood of Brooklyn, New York, in 1930. Her father was a truck driver, and her mother had been a factory worker prior to having children. As a young woman, Selma worked in factories, and then as a full-time housewife and mother to her son, Sam, with whose father, a fellow factory worker, she was in a short-lived marriage. At the age of 15, she had joined the Johnson–Forest Tendency, one of whose three leaders was C. L. R. James, and she began to attend his classes on slavery and the American civil war.

1950s and '60s
In 1952, she wrote the book A Woman's Place, first published as a column in Correspondence, a bi-weekly newspaper written and edited by its readers with an audience of mainly working-class people. Unusual at the time, the newspaper had pages dedicated to giving women, young people and Black people an autonomous voice. She was a regular columnist and edited the Women's Page. In 1955, she came to England to marry C. L. R. James, who had been deported from the United States during the McCarthy period. They were together for 25 years, and were close political colleagues.

From 1958 to 1962, she lived in Trinidad and Tobago, where, with her husband, she was active in the movement for West Indian independence and federation. Returning to Britain after independence, she became the first organising secretary of the Campaign Against Racial Discrimination in 1965, and a founding member of the Black Regional Action Movement and editor of its journal in 1969.

Wages for housework

In January 1971, James made a BBC Radio broadcast in the series People for Tomorrow – using her own experience of working in low-paid jobs and being a mother and housewife, as well as interviews with full-time housewives, and other females working outside the home while still doing most of the household chores – to explore the exploitation of women in society in general. In 1972, the publication The Power of Women and the Subversion of the Community (authored with Mariarosa Dalla Costa) launched the "domestic labour debate" by spelling out how housework and other caring work women do outside of the market produces the whole working class, thus the market economy, based on those workers, is built on women's unwaged work.

That same year, James founded the International Wages for Housework (WFH) campaign, which demands money from the State for the unwaged work in the home and in the community. A raging debate followed about whether caring full-time was "work" or a "role" — and whether it should be compensated with a wage. James's 1972 paper Women, the Unions and Work was presented at the National Conference of Women on March 25–26, 1972. In a 2002 interview with BBC News 24 she stated that housework counted for "basic work in society", that women are entitled to a wage, and said: "We also want the acknowledgement from society that the work we are doing is fundamental and important." Housework counted for "basic work in society", she added.

James is the first spokeswoman of the English Collective of Prostitutes, which campaigns for decriminalisation as well as viable economic alternatives to prostitution. The 1983 publication of James's Marx and Feminism broke with established Marxist theory by providing a reading of Marx's Capital from the point of view of women and of unwaged work.

Beginning in 1985, she co-ordinated the International Women Count Network, which won the UN decision where governments agreed to measure and value unwaged work in national statistics. Legislation on this has since been introduced in Trinidad and Tobago and Spain, and time-use surveys and other research are under way in many countries. In Venezuela, Article 88 of the Constitution recognises work in the home as an economic activity that creates added value and produces wealth and social welfare, and entitles housewives to social security.

Recent activity
James lectures in the UK, the US, and other countries on a wide range of topics, including "Sex, Race, & Class", "What the Marxists Never Told Us About Marx", "The Internationalist Jewish Tradition", "Rediscovering Nyerere's Tanzania", "CLR James as a political organizer", and "Jean Rhys: Jumping to Tia".

Feminist activism
Since 2000, James has been international coordinator of the Global Women's Strike, a network of grassroots women, bringing together actions and initiatives in many countries. The strike demands that society "Invest in Caring Not Killing", and that military budgets be returned to the community starting with women. She has been working with the Venezuelan Revolution since 2002. She is a founder of the Crossroads Women's Centre, begun under the WFH auspices in 1975 in a red-light district near London's Euston railway station and now located in Kentish Town, and is general editor of Crossroads Books.

Socialist activism
In April 2008, James visited Edinburgh (along with Edinburgh-based couple Ralph and Noreen Ibbott, both members of the Britain Tanzania Society in the 1960s) on the anniversary of Tanzania Muungano Day, which falls on April 26. James gave a talk in a session hosted by the Tanzania Edinburgh Community Association (TzECA) on Julius Nyerere's Ujamaa (African socialism) in the 1960s in Tanzania with reference to the subject of Ruvuma Development Association (RDA), and the Tanzania Arusha Declaration. RDA traces its roots to the original Ruvuma Development Association (RDA), which was registered in the early 1960s when, encouraged by Julius Nyerere the first President of Tanzania, following Independence a number of communal villages joined together and organised themselves into what became known as the Ujamaa villages. The driving force behind the Association was Ntimbanjayo Millinga, who was the secretary of the local branch of the Tanzanian African National Union Youth League, and he was supported by Ralph Ibbott, an English quantity surveyor who acted as an advisor and agreed to live and work with his family in the village of Litowa. The session took place at the "Waverley Care Solas" Abbey Mount.

In July 2015, James endorsed Jeremy Corbyn's campaign in the Labour Party leadership election.

Anti-zionist activism
James is a founder member of the International Jewish Anti-Zionist Network and, in May 2008, signed the Letter of British Jews on 60th anniversary of Israel published in The Guardian, explaining why she would not celebrate Israel's 60th anniversary. In August 2015, she was a signatory to a letter criticising The Jewish Chronicles reporting of Jeremy Corbyn's association with alleged antisemites.

Notable works
A Woman's Place (1952)
The Power of Women & the Subversion of the Community (with Mariarosa Dalla Costa; Bristol: Falling Wall Press, 1972)
Women, the Unions and Work, or What Is Not To Be Done (Notting Hill Women's Liberation Workshop, 1972; Falling Wall Press, 1976)
Sex, Race & Class (1974)
The Rapist Who Pays the Rent (co-author, 1982)
Marx and Feminism (1983; Crossroads Books, 1994) 
Hookers in the House of the Lord (1983)
The Ladies and the Mammies: Jane Austen and Jean Rhys (Falling Wall Press, 1983)
Strangers & Sisters: Women, Race and Immigration (ed. & introduction; Falling Wall Press, 1985)
The Global Kitchen: The Case for Counting Unwaged Work (1985, 1995)
The Milk of Human Kindness: Defending Breastfeeding from the Global Market and the AIDS Industry (co-author; Crossroads Books, 2003)
Introduction to Creating a Caring Economy: Nora Castañeda & the Women's Development Bank of Venezuela (Crossroads Books, 2006)
Introduction to The Arusha Declaration, Rediscovering Nyerere's Tanzania (2007)
Editor of Jailhouse Lawyers: Prisoners Defending Prisoners Vs the USA by Mumia Abu-Jamal (UK edition Crossroads Books, 2011)
Sex, Race and Class—the Perspective of Winning: A Selection of Writings 1952–2011 (PM Press, 2012)
Our Time Is Now: Sex, Race, Class, and Caring for People and Planet, ed. Nina Lopez, Foreword by Margaret Prescod (PM Press, 2021)

In popular culture
James appeared briefly in Sir Steve McQueen's 2020 retelling of the Mangrove Nine trial, entitled Mangrove, which formed part of McQueen's Small Axe strand. James was portrayed by actress Jodhi May, with Derek Griffiths featuring as C. L. R. James.

James was a participant in How the Mangrove Nine Won, an hour-long film launched in 2020 giving first-hand accounts of the Mangrove Nine trial, also featuring Ian Macdonald and Altheia Jones-LeCointe.

See also
International Wages for Housework Campaign

References

Further reading
The Power of Women and the Subversion of the Community, Bristol: Falling Wall Press, October 1972 (2nd edition February 1973, 3rd edition September 1975).
"Waging the War Over Wages", Los Angeles Times, May 7, 1987.
"Labours of Love, or Maybe Just a Rip-Off", The Times, February 19, 1992.
Selma James and Melissa Benn, "Home Truths for Feminists | How Should the Work Women do as Mothers be Rewarded?", The Guardian, February 21, 2004.
Jenny Turner, "As Many Pairs of Shoes as She Likes", London Review of Books, Vol. 33, No. 24, December 15, 2011, pp. 11–15.

External links
Global Women's Strike/ Wages For Housework/ Selma James website
"Sex, Race, and Class", audio recording of a lecture given by Selma James at Dickinson College, November 7, 2007. 
Interview, Tribune Magazine, November 3, 2008.
Selma James and Ron Augustin, "Beyond Boundaries" (interview), Monthly Review, September 1, 2019.
"'Real Theory Is in What You Do and How You Do It. Camila Valle interviews Selma James about feminism, anti-imperialism, and a lifetime of international Marxist organizing. Verso Books Blog, January 11, 2021.

1930 births
Living people
20th-century American non-fiction writers
20th-century American women writers
21st-century American non-fiction writers
21st-century American women writers
American civil rights activists
American columnists
American feminist writers
American Marxists
American socialist feminists
American socialists
American women columnists
American women's rights activists
Jewish activists
Jewish American writers
Jewish feminists
Jewish humanists
Jewish socialists
Jewish women writers
Labour Party (UK) people
Marxist feminists
Marxist humanists
Marxist theorists
New York (state) socialists
Sex worker activists in the United States
Trinidad and Tobago socialists
Women civil rights activists
Women Marxists
Women's page journalists
Workers' rights activists